Daniel O'Morrey was an Anglican priest in Ireland in the 17th-century: a prebendary of Carncastle in Connor,  he was  Archdeacon of Dromore  from 1609 until 1663.

Notes

Archdeacons of Dromore
17th-century Irish Anglican priests